Sonja Tomić (born 29 May 1947) is a contemporary Croatian writer, translator, illustrator, croatist, Germanist and radio presenter. She has been noted for her works in children's literature and travelogues. She won the 2011 Literary Kranjčić.

Education 
Born in Dubrovnik in 1947, she graduated theology, mathematics, germanistics and Croatian language and literature at the University of Zagreb. She lectured Croatian language for foreigners and both mathematics and physics at the monastic gymnasium Marianum, as well as German at the XVIII gymnasium in Zagreb and at the Catholic Faculty of Theology of the University of Zagreb.

Work 
She is a member of the Croatian Writers' Association. She writes for Kolo, Glas Koncila, Kana, Veritas, as well for children magazines Smib, Zvrk and Mak. She is an editor of children radio emissions at the Croatian Radio, Croatian Catholic Radio and Radio Maria.
Her literary works were translated in Slovakian, Swedish, German, English, French and Italian, partially by her. Her husband Stjepan is also writer and co-author of two works. She collaborated with Stjepan Lice, Bonaventura Duda, Ivanka Brađašević and other noted Croatian Catholic writers and intellectuals.

Her children's literature corresponds with biblical-inspired literature of Selma Lagerlöf.

She won the 2011 Literary Kranjčić.

References

External links 
 Short biography at the verbum.hr
 Children's program of the Croatian Catholic Radio
 List of scientific articles thematizing Sonja Tomić's literary work at the Hrčak – Portal of Croatian scientific and professional journals

1947 births
Living people
People from Dubrovnik
University of Zagreb alumni
20th-century Croatian women writers
21st-century Croatian women writers
Croatian translators
Croatian illustrators
Croatian women illustrators
Croatian children's writers
Croatian children's book illustrators
Croatian radio presenters
Croatian women radio presenters
Germanists
Croatian Roman Catholics